Alan Julian Macbeth Tudor-Hart    (9 March 1927 – 1 July 2018), commonly known as Julian Tudor Hart, was a general practitioner (GP) who worked in Wales for 30 years, known for theorising the Inverse care law. He produced medical research and wrote many books and medical articles.

Early life 
Hart was born in London on 9 March 1927, the son of Alexander Tudor-Hart and Alison Macbeth. He studied medicine at Cambridge University and in London, graduating in 1952.

He is a descendant of American businessman Frederic Tudor and Ephraim Hart, a Bavarian Jew who became a prominent merchant in New York, and was reportedly partners with John Jacob Astor. The name was originally Hirz.

His paternal grandfather, the Canadian artist Percyval Hart, married his Polish-French cousin Éléonora Délia Julie Aimée Hart Kleczkowska, and later changed the family surname to Tudor-Hart. Kleczkowska was the daughter of diplomat Michel Alexandre Cholewa, comte Kleczkowski (Michał Kleczkowski; 1818–1886) and granddaughter of Julie Sobieska, a direct descendant of John III Sobieski, king of Poland in the 17th century.

He was a member of the Sigerist Society from 1947 to 1955.

Hart joined the Communist Party of Great Britain, following his father Alex, and stood unsuccessfully as the CPGB candidate for Aberavon at the 1964, 1966 and 1970 general elections.

Career
In 1961, he moved to Glyncorrwg in Wales. There, he worked for 30 years as a general practitioner. One of his partners was Brian Gibbons, later minister for health in Wales. Hart became involved in epidemiological research, with Richard Doll and Archie Cochrane. He was a passionate advocate of the National Health Service and of socialism. He was President of the Socialist Health Association.

He was a Fellow of the Royal College of General Practitioners (RCGP) and the Royal College of Physicians (RCP).

In 2006, he was awarded the inaugural Discovery Prize by the RCGP as "a general practitioner who has captured the imagination of generations of GPs with his groundbreaking research". His practice in Glyncorrwg, Wales, was the first in the UK to be recognised as a research practice, piloting many Medical Research Council studies. He was also the first doctor to routinely measure every patient's blood pressure and as a result was able to reduce premature mortality in high risk patients at his practice by 30%. Graham Watt, professor of general practice at the University of Glasgow, nominated Tudor Hart for the award. Watt said: "His ideas and example pervade modern general practice and remain at the cutting edge of thinking and practice concerning health improvement in primary care. His work on hypertension showed how high quality records, teamwork and audit are the keys to health improvement. His life-long commitment to the daily tasks of general practice has always given his work and views a salience and credibility with fellow general practitioners. Julian Tudor Hart has been and will remain an inspiration to health practitioners and the communities they serve."

Hart died on 1 July 2018 at the age of 91 years.

Author 
He wrote many books and scientific articles. His last book, The Political Economy of Health Care: A Clinical Perspective explores how the NHS might be reconstituted as a humane service for all (rather than a profitable one for the few) and a civilising influence on society as a whole. The book provides 'a big picture' for students, academics, health professionals and NHS users that Tudor Hart hopes will inspire them to challenge received wisdoms about how the NHS should develop in the 21st century.

Hart lists nine (9) characteristics of the National Health Service in its founding that are distinctive and essential to it.
 A united national service devoted directly and indirectly to care, fully available to all citizens.
 A gift economy including everyone, funded by general taxation, of which the largest component was income tax.
 Its most important inputs and processes are personal interactions between lay and professional people.
 Its products were potentially measurable as health gains for the whole population.
 Its staff and component units were not expected to compete for market share but to co-operate to maximise useful service.
 Continuity was central to its efficiency and effectiveness.
 Its local staff and local populations believed they had moral ownership of and loyalty to neighbourhood NHS units.
 None of its decisions and few of its procedures could be fully standardised.  All of its decisions entailed some uncertainty and doubt.  They were therefore unsuited to commodity form, either for personal sale or for long-term contracts.
 The NHS was a labour-intensive economy.  Every new diagnostic or therapeutic machine generates new needs for more skilled staff able to control and interpret the work of the machines and translate them into human terms.

His other writing includes many articles on the management of high blood pressure and on the organisation of health services. His most influential, The Inverse Care Law, published in the Lancet 1971 asserts: "The availability of good medical care tends to vary inversely with the need for the population served.  This inverse care law operates more completely where medical care is most exposed to market forces, and less so where such exposure is reduced."

Publications

Scientific articles 
 
 
 
 
 
 
 
 
 
 
 
 
 Hart JT. "Two paths for medical practice. The Lancet 1992 sept 26; 340
 
 
 
 
 
 
 Hart JT. The National Health Service as precursor for future society. 2002

Books 
 Hart JT. The National Health Service: in England and Wales. Communist Party of Great Britain; 1970.
 Hart JT, Communist Party of Great Britain. The National Health Service in England and Wales: a marxist perspective. London Health Students Branch. Research and Study Group, Marxists in Medicine; 1971.
 Hypertension: community control of high blood pressure. First edition. 1980.
 Hart JT. An exchange of letters: hospital referrals. MSD Foundation; 1985.
 A new kind of doctor: the general practitioner’s part in the health of the community. London: Merlin Press; 1988.
 Hart JT, Stilwell B, Gray M. Prevention of coronary heart disease and stroke: a workbook for primary care teams. Faber; 1988.
 Hart JT, Pickering G. Hipertensión: su control en la comunidad. Doyma; 1989.
 Hypertension: community control of high blood pressure. Third edition. Oxford: Radcliffe Medical Press; 1993.
 Feasible Socialism: National Health Service past, present and future. London: Socialist Health Association; 1994
 Going for Gold: a new approach to primary medical care in the South Wales valleys. Swansea: Socialist Health Association; 1997.
 Going to the doctor. In: Cooter R, Pickstone J (eds). Medicine in the 20th Century. Amsterdam: Harwood Academic Publishers; 2000. p. 543-58.
 Hart JT, Savage W, Fahey T. High Blood Pressure at Your Fingertips: The Comprehensive and Medically Accurate Manual on How to Manage Your High Blood Pressure. McGraw-Hill Australia; 2003.
 What you need to know in nine pages. In: Fahey T, Murphy D, Hart JT. High Blood Pressure. Excerpt from High Blood Pressure at your fingertips. Third edition: London: Class Publishing; 2004.
 Hart JT. Storming the Citadel: from romantic fiction to effective reality. In: Michael PF, Webster C (eds). Health and Society in Twentieth Century Wales. University of Wales Press; 2006. p. 208-15.
  The Political Economy of Health Care: A clinical perspective. Bristol: Policy Press; 2006.
 Hart JT. La economía política de la sanidad. Una perspectiva clínica. Madrid: Ediciones GPS Madrid; 2009.
 Hart JT. The political economy of health care: Where the NHS came from and where it could lead (2 ed). Bristol: Policy Press; 2010.

Bibliography 
 The progressive practitioner: Dr Julian Tudor Hart. The New Generalist. 2007;5(1):62-5.

References

External links 
 
 Personal website

1927 births
2018 deaths
People from London
British people of American descent
British people of Canadian descent
British people of Polish descent
British people of German-Jewish descent
National Health Service people
Alumni of the University of Cambridge
20th-century Welsh medical doctors
British general practitioners
Fellows of the Royal College of General Practitioners
Fellows of the Royal College of Physicians